The 2023 United States attorney general elections will be held on November 7, 2023, to elect the attorneys general of three U.S. states. The previous elections for this group of states took place in 2019.

These elections will take place concurrently with several other state and local elections.

Race summary

Kentucky 

Attorney General Daniel Cameron was elected in 2019 with 57.7% of the vote. He has opted to run for governor rather than seek a second term.

Louisiana 

Attorney General Jeff Landry was re-elected in 2019 with 66.2% of the vote. Because Louisiana does not have constitutional term limits for statewide offices besides the governor, Landry was eligible to run for a third term, but is instead running for governor.

Mississippi 

Attorney General Lynn Fitch was elected in 2019 with 57.83% of the vote, becoming the state's first Republican Attorney General since 1878. Fitch is running for re-election.

Democratic Attorney and Disability Rights Mississippi Litigation Director Greta Kemp Martin is running to challenge Fitch.

See also 
 2023 United States elections

Notes

References